Alexandre Mallet (born May 22, 1992) is a Canadian professional ice hockey centreman. He is currently playing for HC Vítkovice Ridera of the Czech Extraliga (ELH).

Playing career
Mallet began his major junior career in 2009 with the Rouyn-Noranda Huskies of the Quebec Major Junior Hockey League (QMJHL). He was traded to the Rimouski Océanic in 2010. After an impressive 2011–12 with the Océanic in which he scored 81 points in 68 games, Mallet was drafted by the Vancouver Canucks in the 2nd Round (57th Overall) in the 2012 NHL Entry Draft.    
 
Mallet started his professional career with the then Canucks' American Hockey League (AHL) affiliate Chicago Wolves in the 2012–13. Unable to find his place on the roster, Mallet was sent down to the Kalamazoo Wings of the ECHL. On November 25, 2014 Mallet was traded along with a 2016 3rd Round Pick to the New York Islanders in exchange for defenceman Andrey Pedan.

Mallet played the remainder of the 2014–15 season with the Stockton Thunder, the Islanders ECHL affiliate. The Islanders did not tender a qualifying offer and at the end of the season, Mallet became a free agent. On August 3, 2015, Mallet was signed by his former team, the Kalamazoo Wings of the ECHL.

After four seasons in North America, Mallet opted to pursue a career abroad, agreeing to a one-year contract with Czech Liga outfit, HC Dynamo Pardubice on July 16, 2016. He moved to HC Kometa Brno, winning the Czech ELH Trophy in 2016–17, and winning again in 2017–18.

After three seasons with Brno, Mallet left as a free agent to sign a one-year contract with fellow Czech club, HC Vítkovice Ridera, on August 20, 2019.

Career statistics

References

External links 

1992 births
Living people
Canadian ice hockey centres
Chicago Wolves players
HC Dynamo Pardubice players
Kalamazoo Wings (ECHL) players
HC Kometa Brno players
Ice hockey people from Quebec
Rimouski Océanic players
Stockton Thunder players
Utica Comets players
Vancouver Canucks draft picks
HC Vítkovice players
Dragons de Rouen players
PSG Berani Zlín players
Grizzlys Wolfsburg players
Canadian expatriate ice hockey players in the United States
Canadian expatriate ice hockey players in the Czech Republic
Canadian expatriate ice hockey players in France
Canadian expatriate ice hockey players in Germany
People from Amqui